is a Japanese author who won an Akutagawa Prize in 2006.

Biography
Itō was born in Kobe, Hyōgo Prefecture, Japan. As a middle-school student, he was a classmate of Ken Hirai. He later graduated from Waseda University.

Prizes
 Bungei Prize (1995)
 Shōgakukan Children's Publications Culture Prize (2000)
 Jōji Hirata Literature Prize
 Akutagawa Prize (2006) for the novel "八月の路上に捨てる" (Hachigatsu no rojō ni suteru - literally means "Desert on the August road")

References

External links
 J'Lit | Authors : Takami Ito | Books from Japan

1971 births
20th-century Japanese novelists
21st-century Japanese novelists
Living people
Akutagawa Prize winners
People from Kobe